"Personality" is a popular song with lyrics by Johnny Burke and music by Jimmy Van Heusen. It was written for the 1946 film Road to Utopia, and Dorothy Lamour performed it in the movie.  Van Heusen said that he wrote the song with a limited vocal range to accommodate Lamour.

In a slightly longer version, the song became a number one Billboard hit for Johnny Mercer  and the Pied Pipers with Capitol Records in 1946. Dinah Shore also recorded it around that time. Lamour was between record contracts at the time of the film's release, so she did not record the song herself until years later.

The song employs tongue-in-cheek, slightly bawdy lyrics and an ironic use of the word "personality." The lyrics suggest that men are often attracted to a woman because of her shapely figure (called euphemistically her “personality”) rather than other beauty traits or any other admirable qualities she might possess.

Cover versions
Bing Crosby recorded the song with Eddie Condon and His Orchestra in January 1946 and it reached the No. 9 spot in the Billboard charts in April 1946.
Al Hirt released a version on his 1964 album, Beauty and the Beard.

Song in popular culture
Rewritten versions of the song have been used as commercial jingles. The most notable was "Wessonality," an advertisement for Wesson cooking oil sung by Florence Henderson.
The Johnny Mercer version features in the 2015 videogame Fallout 4 on the in-game radio station Diamond City Radio.
The song plays on the soundtrack during the screen test preparation montage in episode 4 of Ryan Murphy’s Hollywood miniseries.

References

1946 songs
1946 singles
Songs written for films
Songs with lyrics by Johnny Burke (lyricist)
Songs with music by Jimmy Van Heusen
Dorothy Lamour songs
Dinah Shore songs
Al Hirt songs
Johnny Mercer songs